"Easy to Be Hard" is a song from the 1967 rock musical Hair.  It was written by Galt MacDermot, James Rado, and Gerome Ragni, who put the musical together in the mid-1960s.  The original recording of the musical featuring the song was released in May 1968 with the song being sung by Lynn Kellogg, who performed the role of Sheila on stage in the musical.  The song was first covered by American band Three Dog Night on their 1969 album Suitable for Framing, with the lead vocal part sung by Chuck Negron, and was produced by Gabriel Mekler.

Three Dog Night's version of the song reached number four on the Billboard Hot 100 in 1969, and was ranked number 33 on Billboard'''s Hot 100 songs of 1969.

A decade later, in 1979, the film version of Hair, directed by Miloš Forman was released, with "Easy to Be Hard" sung by Cheryl Barnes.

Chart history

Weekly charts

Year-end charts

Other versions
Stony Brook People released the song as a demo only single in April, 1969 in the United States.
John Rowles released the song as a single in 1969 in the Netherlands.
Jennifer Warnes released the song as a single in 1969.  It peaked on the chart at number 128 in the US.
Cher recorded the song on November 28 1969. The recording was eventually released as a bonus track on the 2001 CD re-release of her ATCO album, 3614 Jackson Highway.
Sérgio Mendes and Brasil '66 released the song as a single in 1970 in the United Kingdom.
Shirley Bassey released a version, first issued as the B-side to her hit Something in 1970, and subsequently featured on her album of the same name.
Cheryl Barnes, who did the version in the film adaptation of Hair, released a version as a single in 1979.  It reached number 64 on the Billboard Hot 100.
Minneapolis rock group Golden Smog covered the song in 1992 on their debut EP On Golden Smog.
Three Dog Night's version was sampled on the song "One to One Religion" by Bomb The Bass and on the song "Old to the New" by Nice & Smooth in 1994.  Their song was also sampled on the song "A Grand Love Theme" by Kid Loco in 1997.

In media
Three Dog Night's version was used in the 2005 The Simpsons episode, "Thank God, It's Doomsday" and at the beginning of the 2007 film Zodiac''.

References

1967 songs
1969 singles
1979 singles
Three Dog Night songs
Jennifer Warnes songs
Sérgio Mendes songs
Dunhill Records singles
Songs from Hair (musical)
Songs from musicals
Songs written for films